William Erese (born 12 September 1976) is a retired male hurdler from Nigeria. His personal best time is 13.42 seconds, achieved in July 2003 in Mals, (Italy). This is the current Nigerian record.

Achievements

References

External links

1976 births
Living people
Nigerian male hurdlers
Athletes (track and field) at the 1996 Summer Olympics
Olympic athletes of Nigeria
African Games gold medalists for Nigeria
African Games medalists in athletics (track and field)
Athletes (track and field) at the 1995 All-Africa Games
Athletes (track and field) at the 1999 All-Africa Games
Athletes (track and field) at the 2003 All-Africa Games
20th-century Nigerian people
21st-century Nigerian people